Orientolaelaps is a genus of mites in the family Digamasellidae.

Species
 Orientolaelaps eutamiasi Bregetova & Shcherbak, 1977

References

Rhodacaridae